Meanwhile Back in Paris... is the debut studio album by Canadian rock band Streetheart. It was released in 1978 and features the band's first two singles, "Action" and "Look at Me". The title comes from the lyrics of the album's opening track "Action". The album was followed by 1979's Under Heaven Over Hell.

In 1995, Repertoire Records re-released the album on CD. It only held the songs from the original LP and all physical media issues of the album have since remained out of print. However, the album is still available via online MP3 download on major sites such as Amazon, and iTunes.

In February 1981, Meanwhile Back in Paris... was certified platinum in Canada (in excess of 100,000 copies sold).

Track listing

Side one
 "Action" 4:48
 "Pressure" 3:54
 "Can You Feel It" 3:31
 "Move On Over" 5:18

Side two
 "Look at Me" 3:46
 "Captain Rhythm" 4:21
 "Streetwalker" 3:55
 "People (Takin' Pieces of Me)" 3:40
 "Just for You" 4:18

Personnel
Credits are adapted from the Meanwhile Back in Paris... liner notes.

Streetheart
 Kenny Shields – lead vocals
 Paul Dean – guitar; backing vocals
 Matthew Frenette – drums; percussion
 Ken Sinnaeve – bass guitar; backing vocals
 Daryll Gutheil – keyboards; backing vocals

Production and artwork
 George Semkiw – producer; engineer
 Streetheart – producer
 Jeff Stobbs – assistant engineer
 Mark Wright – assistant engineer
 Mick Walsh – assistant engineer
 Gary Muth – executive producer
 Myron Zabol – photography

References

External links

1978 debut albums
Streetheart (band) albums